Verbruggen, Verbrugghen, Verbrugge and Verbrugghe are Dutch toponymic surnames. They are a contraction of "van der Brugge(n)", meaning "from the bridge". Notable people with the surname include:

Verbruggen / Verbrugghen
Gaspar Peeter Verbruggen the Elder (1635–1681), Flemish painter (father)
Gaspar Peeter Verbruggen the Younger (1664–1730), Flemish painter (son)
Hein Verbruggen (1941–2017), Dutch International Olympic Committee member
Hendrik Frans Verbrugghen (1654–1724), Flemish sculptor
Henri Verbrugghen (1873–1934), Belgian conductor and violinist, founder of the Verbrugghen String Quartet
Jakob Verbruggen (born 1980), Belgian TV and film director
Jan Verbruggen (1712–1781), Dutch painter and master founder
Joffrey Verbruggen (born 1989), Belgian actor
John Verbruggen (died 1708), English actor, husband of Susanna
Marlies Verbruggen (born 1988), Belgian footballer
Marion Verbruggen (born 1950), Dutch recorder player
Pieter Verbrugghen I (1615–1686), Flemish sculptor, father of Hendrik Frans and Pieter II
Pieter Verbrugghen II (1648–1691), Flemish sculptor, draughtsman, etcher and stone merchant
Susanna Verbruggen (c. 1667–1703), English actor, wife of John
Verbrugge / Verbrugghe
Albert Verbrugghe, Belgian crime victim
Brecht Verbrugghe (born 1982), Belgian footballer
Carel Verbrugge (1926–1985), Dutch singer, actor and radio/TV personality known as "Willy Alberti"
Cyrille Verbrugge (1866–1929), Belgian fencer
Henri Verbrugghe (1929–2009), Belgian sprint canoeist
Jean Verbrugge (1896–1964), Belgian fencer
Rik Verbrugghe (born 1974), Belgian road racing cyclist
Rineke Verbrugge (born 1965), Dutch logician and computer scientist
Sven Verbrugge (born 1967), Belgian sidecar cross rider
Willy Albertina Verbrugge (born 1945), Dutch singer and actress known as "Willeke Alberti"

See also
Van Bruggen (including Van der Brugg(h)en)

References

Dutch-language surnames
Toponymic surnames